The 2011 Open de Nice Côte d'Azur was a men's tennis tournament play on outdoor clay courts. It was the 27th edition of the Open de Nice Côte d'Azur and was part of the ATP World Tour 250 series of the 2011 ATP World Tour. It took place at the Nice Lawn Tennis Club in Nice, France, from 16 May through 21 May 2011. Third-seeded Nicolás Almagro won the singles title.

Finals

Singles

 Nicolás Almagro defeated  Victor Hănescu, 6–7(5–7), 6–3, 6–3

It was the 10th ATP Tournament won by Nicolás Almagro in his career.

Doubles

 Eric Butorac /  Jean-Julien Rojer defeated  Santiago González /  David Marrero, 6–3, 6–4

Entrants

Seeds

 Seedings as of May 9, 2011.

Other entrants
The following players received wildcards into the main draw:
  Julien Benneteau
  Ernests Gulbis
  Édouard Roger-Vasselin

The following players received entry from the qualifying draw:

  Andreas Haider-Maurer
  Benoît Paire
  Pere Riba
  Guillaume Rufin

The following players received entry from a lucky loser spot:
  Robin Haase
  Michael Russell

Withdrawals
  Andy Roddick (right shoulder injury)
  Pablo Cuevas (leg injury)

References

External links
 
 ITF tournament edition details

 
2011 ATP World Tour
2011
2011 in French tennis
21st century in Nice
May 2011 sports events in France